Pseudoameroseius is a genus of mites in the family Ameroseiidae. This genus has a single species, Pseudoameroseius michaelangeli.

References

External links

 

Acari
Monotypic arachnid genera